Guardian of Water is a 1939 fountain and sculpture by Donal Hord, installed outside the San Diego County Administration Center, in the U.S. state of California. The statue was dedicated on June 10, 1939.

See also

 1939 in art

References

External links
 

1939 establishments in California
1939 sculptures
Fountains in California
Outdoor sculptures in San Diego
Sculptures of women in California
Statues in San Diego